Parliamentary elections were held in Portugal on 10 July 1921. Prior to the elections, the Republican Union had merged with the Evolutionist Party to form the Republican Liberal Party (PLR). The elections resulted in the PLR becoming the largest in Parliament, winning 79 of the 163 seats in the House of Representatives and 32 of the 71 seats in the Senate.

The government that was subsequently formed lasted only a few months, as on 19 October (the "night of blood"), a military coup resulted in the deaths of several prominent conservative figures including prime minister António Granjo.  New elections were held in January 1922.

Results

Notes

References

Legislative elections in Portugal
Portugal
Legislative
Portuguese legislative election